A warrant of appointment is the official document presented by the President of Ireland to persons upon appointment to certain high offices of state, signed by the president and bearing the Official Seal of the President. Warrants are presented, among others, to judges, the Attorney General, the Comptroller and Auditor General and the Ombudsman.

References

See also
 List of Ireland-related topics
 Royal warrant of appointment

Office of the President of Ireland